"All in the Suit That You Wear" is a song by the American rock band Stone Temple Pilots. The song was the band's final single before their break-up in 2003 and only appears on the compilation album Thank You. Credited as being written by all members in the band, "All in the Suit That You Wear" received moderate radio airplay, peaking at number five on the Mainstream Rock chart and number 19 on the Modern Rock chart. The style and structure of the song is a nod to the style of the band's debut album, Core. "All in the Suit That You Wear" was originally intended to be on the soundtrack for the Spider-Man film in 2002, but was pulled from the soundtrack when it was not used as the lead track. In May 2008, the song appeared in an episode of CSI: NY. In 2013 the song was covered by Grenouer, alternative metal band from Russia, and released worldwide by Mausoleum Records.

Track listing
"All in the Suit That You Wear" – 3:41
"Sex Type Thing" (live video)

Charts

References

Stone Temple Pilots songs
2003 singles
Songs written by Scott Weiland
Songs written by Robert DeLeo
Songs written by Dean DeLeo
Songs written by Eric Kretz
2003 songs